11/11/11 is a 2011 horror film directed by Keith Allan and starring Jon Briddell, Erin Coker, and Hayden Byerly. It is The Asylum's "mockbuster" equivalent to Darren Lynn Bousman's 11-11-11. It is also a knockoff of The Omen.

Premise
Jack and Melissa Vales become increasingly frightened as their young son, Nathan, expresses violent and bizarre behavior; what the couple soon learn is that their son's upcoming birthday of November 11, the Apocalypse will occur and Nathan is the gateway.

Cast

See also
12/12/12 (film)
13/13/13 (film)

References

External links
 
 

2011 films
2011 horror films
2011 independent films
American supernatural horror films
2010s English-language films
2010s parody films
The Asylum films
2010s supernatural horror films
2011 comedy films
2010s American films